A statue of Jackie Robinson and George Shuba known as A Handshake for the Century was unveiled in Youngstown, Ohio, in 2021.

References

2021 establishments in Ohio
2021 sculptures
Cultural depictions of Jackie Robinson
Monuments and memorials in Ohio
Outdoor sculptures in Ohio
Sculptures of African Americans
Statues in Ohio
Statues of sportspeople